"Stryderman" is the lead single from recording artist Tinchy Stryder's second studio album, Catch 22. The single was released on 20 July 2008. The single was included on BBC Radio 1's C Playlist and eventually debuted at number 73 on the UK Singles Chart, becoming Stryder's first single to chart on the UK Singles Chart.

Critical reception
Gavin Martin of The Mirror gave the song the following review: "Wearing his mean, East London street cred on his sleeve, Tinchy, aka Kwasi Danquah III, is an independently-marketed star who's built a reputation selling own-brand T-shirts, appearing on Mike Skinner records, and has the support of rap power broker DJ Tim Westwood. So far, so predictable, an impression compounded by the workaday sound - dirty buzz bass to the fore, and standard ghetto superhero boasting. Easy, Stryder."

Track listing

Charts

Release history

References

2008 singles
Tinchy Stryder songs
Songs with music by Tinchy Stryder
Songs written by Fraser T. Smith
Song recordings produced by Fraser T. Smith
Takeover Entertainment singles
2008 songs